Adomerus is a genus of true bugs belonging to the family Cydnidae.

Taxonomy 
Adomerus has the following species:

 Adomerus biguttatus 

 Adomerus fuscipennis
 Adomerus maculipes 

 Adomerus rotundus 

 Adomerus triguttulus 
 Adomerus variegatus

References

Cydnidae
Hemiptera genera